Saratov Airlines (Saratov Airlines Joint Stock Company, Saratovskiye avialinii) was a Russian airline headquartered in Saratov and based at Saratov Tsentralny Airport. The company ceased operating on 30 May 2018 after the Russian aviation authority refused to renew its operating certificate.

History
Saratov Airlines was founded in 1931. It was called "Saratov United Air Squad" and was a part of Aeroflot. Until late 2013 the airline was branded Saravia.

In December 2013, Saratov Airlines became the first Russian operator of Embraer E-Jets, with the arrival of two Embraer 195 aircraft.

On 14 October 2015, the Russian aviation authorities sanctioned Saratov Airlines after a violation of security rules. The airline was therefore no longer allowed to operate flights to destinations outside of Russia from 26 October 2015. However, by May 2016 the airline had resumed international charter services.

In July 2017, it was announced that the airline had signed a letter of intent to lease six Irkut MC-21-300s at the MAKS Air Show in Moscow scheduled to be delivered from 2022–2025.

On 20 March 2018, the Russian Ministry of Transport ordered the suspension of all Saratov Airline flights following the investigation into the Saratov Airlines Flight 703 crash. The airline responded with a message on its website stating that it "continues to carry out flights on Embraer-190 and Yak-42 aircraft". Later in the day it emerged that the Ministry of Transport had shortened the period of validity of the airline's operating certificate to 27 April 2018. On 2 April the Russian aviation authority called on the airline to voluntarily cease operating due to its management's "unprecedented and irresponsible" attitude towards ensuring the safety of passengers and crew. One of the reasons for this reaction was the airline's submission of a list of current planes and crew which included the aircraft that crashed and crew members who died in February.

On 10 April 2018, it was announced that Saratov Airlines planned to re-brand itself as Ivolga Airlines. The reasons for this action are various: some experts say this is due to the air crash that occurred in February, by taking the idea from S7 Airlines and Nordavia, that re-branded after air crashes in 2006 and 2009, respectively; some experts say that it is because the airline now flies from hubs other than Saratov, such as Moscow-Domodedovo and Krasnoyarsk-Yemelyanovo. However, the envisioned rebranding never took place.

On 17 May 2018, the Russian aviation authority ordered the airline to stop selling tickets by the end of May. Initially, the company stated that it would permanently cease operations on 31 May. However, later it removed this information from its website, resumed selling tickets, and told the media that it expects its operating certificate to be re-issued no later than 27 May. This however, did not happen and the airline ceased all flights and ticket sales on 30 May 2018. The airline continues to operate the only airport in the Saratov Oblast.

Destinations

As of May 2018, Saratov Airlines operated the following domestic scheduled and international charter passenger flights:

Armenia
 Yerevan – Zvartnots International Airport

Georgia
 Tbilisi – Tbilisi International Airport

Russia
 Blagoveshensk – Ignatyevo Airport
 Chita – Kadala Airport
 Irkutsk – International Airport Irkutsk
 Kirov – Pobedilovo Airport
 Krasnodar – Pashkovsky Airport
 Krasnoyarsk – Yemelyanovo International Airport base
 Mineralnye Vody – Mineralnye Vody Airport
 Moscow – Moscow Domodedovo Airport
 Nizhnevartovsk – Nizhnevartovsk Airport
 Nizhny Novgorod – Strigino Airport
 Orsk – Orsk Airport
 Saint Petersburg – Pulkovo Airport
 Saratov – Saratov Tsentralny Airport base
 Simferopol – Simferopol International Airport
 Surgut – Surgut International Airport seasonal charter
 Ufa – Ufa International Airport
 Ulan-Ude – Baikal International Airport 
 Vladivostok – Vladivostok International Airport
 Volgograd – Gumrak Airport
 Yekaterinburg – Koltsovo Airport

Fleet
As of May 2018, shortly before Saratov Airlines ceased operations, the fleet included the following aircraft:

Incidents and accidents

On 11 February 2018, Saratov Airlines flight 703, disappeared from radar and crashed less than ten minutes after takeoff. The flight, operated using an An-148 and scheduled to depart from Moscow's Domodedovo airport to the Russian city of Orsk, had 71 people on board; 65 passengers and six crew members. The crash occurred near the village of Stepanovskoye about 50 miles southeast of Moscow. No one on board survived the plane crash.

References

External links

Official website 

Defunct airlines of Russia
Former Aeroflot divisions
Airlines established in 1931
Airlines disestablished in 2018
1931 establishments in the Soviet Union
2018 disestablishments in Russia
Companies based in Saratov
Government-owned airlines